In chemistry, carbonylation refers to reactions that introduce carbon monoxide (CO) into organic and inorganic substrates. Carbon monoxide is abundantly available and conveniently reactive, so it is widely used as a reactant in industrial chemistry. The term carbonylation also refers to oxidation of protein side chains.

Organic chemistry
Several industrially useful organic chemicals are prepared by carbonylations, which can be highly selective reactions. Carbonylations produce organic carbonyls, i.e., compounds that contain the  functional group such as aldehydes, carboxylic acids and esters. Carbonylations are the basis of many types of reactions, including hydroformylation and Reppe reactions. These reactions require metal catalysts, which bind and activate the CO. These processes involve transition metal acyl complexes as intermediates. Much of this theme was developed by Walter Reppe.

Hydroformylation

Hydroformylation entails the addition of both carbon monoxide and hydrogen to unsaturated organic compounds, usually alkenes.  The usual products are aldehydes:

The reaction requires metal catalysts that bind CO, forming intermediate metal carbonyls.  Many of the commodity carboxylic acids, i.e. propionic, butyric, valeric, etc, as well as many of the commodity alcohols, i.e. propanol, butanol, amyl alcohol, are derived from aldehydes produced by hydroformylation.  In this way, hydroformylation is a gateway from alkenes to oxygenates.

Decarbonylation
Many organic carbonyls undergo decarbonylation. A common transformation involves the conversion of aldehydes to alkanes, usually catalyzed by metal complexes:

Few catalysts are highly active or exhibit broad scope.

Acetic acid and acetic anhydride
Large-scale applications of carbonylation are the Monsanto acetic acid process and Cativa process, which convert methanol to acetic acid. In another major industrial process, acetic anhydride is prepared by a related carbonylation of methyl acetate.

Oxidative carbonylation

The oxidative carbonylation of methanol is catalyzed by copper(I) salts, which form transient carbonyl complexes. For the oxidative carbonylation of alkenes, palladium complexes are used.

Hydrocarboxylation and hydroesterification
In hydrocarboxylation, alkenes and alkynes are the substrates. This method is used industrially to produce propionic acid from ethylene using nickel carbonyl as the catalyst:

In the industrial synthesis of ibuprofen, a benzylic alcohol is converted to the corresponding arylacetic acid via a Pd-catalyzed carbonylation:

Acrylic acid was once mainly prepared by the hydrocarboxylation of acetylene.  
 
Nowadays, however, the preferred route to acrylic acid entails the oxidation of propene, exploiting its low cost and the high reactivity of the allylic  bonds.

Hydroesterification is like hydrocarboxylation, but it uses alcohols in place of water.

The process is catalyzed by Herrmann's catalyst, . Under similar conditions, other Pd-diphosphines catalyze formation of polyketones.

Other reactions
The Koch reaction is a special case of hydrocarboxylation reaction that does not rely on metal catalysts. Instead, the process is catalyzed by strong acids such as sulfuric acid or the combination of phosphoric acid and boron trifluoride. The reaction is less applicable to simple alkene.  The industrial synthesis of glycolic acid is achieved in this way:

The conversion of isobutene to pivalic acid is also illustrative:

Alkyl, benzyl, vinyl, aryl, and allyl halides can also be carbonylated in the presence carbon monoxide and suitable catalysts such as manganese, iron, or nickel powders.

Carbonylation in inorganic chemistry

Metal carbonyls, compounds with the formula  (M = metal; L =  other ligands) are prepared by carbonylation of transition metals. Most other metals form carbonyls less directly, such as from their oxides or halides. Metal carbonyls are widely employed as catalysts in the hydroformylation and Reppe processes discussed above. Inorganic compounds that contain CO ligands can also undergo decarbonylation, often via a photochemical reaction.

References

Chemical reactions
Carbon monoxide